The Solgae-class LCAC (Hangul: 솔개급 고속상륙정, Hanja: 솔개級高速上陸艇), often called ''Solgae 631'' class (Hangul: 솔개 631급, Hanja: 솔개631級) because of the name of lead ship, is an air-cushioned landing craft (LCAC) designed for the Republic of Korea Navy, by Hanjin Heavy Industries, to operate from  and future s. This project during development that known as the LSF-II or Landing Ship Fast - II. The craft can carry a maximum load of 55 tons, land on hostile beaches doing 40 knots and it can climb at up to 6 degrees. They have 20 mm cannons for self defense. The crew cockpit carry three crew and a landing-force commander. The LCAC can also carry, in addition to troops, a main battle tank or two amphibious assault vehicles. So far three of these units have been delivered, and more are likely to be ordered. It has been offered for export to foreign navies.

Sources

Amphibious warfare vessels of the Republic of Korea Navy
Military hovercraft
Landing craft
Ships built by Hanjin Heavy Industries